Pukemoremore is a mount and surrounding rural community in the Waikato District and Waikato region of New Zealand's North Island.

Demographics

Pukemoremore had a population of 2,394 at the 2018 New Zealand census, an increase of 297 people (14.2%) since the 2013 census, and an increase of 528 people (28.3%) since the 2006 census. There were 759 households, comprising 1,200 males and 1,197 females, giving a sex ratio of 1.0 males per female. The median age was 39.4 years (compared with 37.4 years nationally), with 570 people (23.8%) aged under 15 years, 390 (16.3%) aged 15 to 29, 1,164 (48.6%) aged 30 to 64, and 273 (11.4%) aged 65 or older.

Ethnicities were 80.7% European/Pākehā, 20.8% Māori, 1.6% Pacific peoples, 4.4% Asian, and 1.6% other ethnicities. People may identify with more than one ethnicity.

The percentage of people born overseas was 15.5, compared with 27.1% nationally.

Although some people chose not to answer the census's question about religious affiliation, 53.0% had no religion, 36.3% were Christian, 1.3% had Māori religious beliefs, 0.1% were Hindu, 0.1% were Muslim, 0.3% were Buddhist and 1.4% had other religions.

Of those at least 15 years old, 507 (27.8%) people had a bachelor's or higher degree, and 243 (13.3%) people had no formal qualifications. The median income was $40,700, compared with $31,800 nationally. 489 people (26.8%) earned over $70,000 compared to 17.2% nationally. The employment status of those at least 15 was that 1,044 (57.2%) people were employed full-time, 291 (16.0%) were part-time, and 51 (2.8%) were unemployed.

Education

It is a Māori language school.

References

Waikato District
Populated places in Waikato